The Miami University Synchronized Skating Team is a senior-level synchronized skating team from the United States. Their homeclub is Miami University, in Oxford, Ohio. They were the U.S. national champions in 1999, 2006 and 2009. They became the first American team to medal at the ISU World Synchronized Skating Championships by earning the silver medal at the 2007 championships in London, Ontario, Canada. They are three-time winners of the EDI Award for Best Synchronized Skating Performance at the U.S. national championships.

The varsity program also has a collegiate-level team which holds the record in U.S. Figure Skating for most consecutive national titles (2005–2016) in any discipline of skating at any level, with a total of 18 national titles.

Their free programs are choreographed by Sarah Kawahara, while DeGirolamo and Scott Brown choreograph their short programs.

The team trains at the Goggin Ice Center, at Miami University.

Competitive highlights

2019-20 to - seasons

2009-10 to 2018-19 seasons

1999-00 to 2008-09 seasons

References

External links

 Miami University Synchro
 

Senior synchronized skating teams
Miami University
World Synchronized Skating Championships medalists